Ticket to the Moon: The Very Best of Electric Light Orchestra Volume 2 is a 2007 compilation album by Electric Light Orchestra, and is a companion to 2005's All Over the World.

The album features most, although not all post-1973 UK singles that did not make the first album, together with band leader and songwriter Jeff Lynne's input of best album tracks, however again not featuring the albums The Electric Light Orchestra and ELO 2.

Track listing
All tracks written by Jeff Lynne.

Personnel
Jeff Lynne – Vocals, Guitars, Keyboards, Bass
Bev Bevan – Drums, Percussion
Richard Tandy – Keyboards, Guitar
Kelly Groucutt – Bass, Vocals
Mik Kaminski – Violin
Hugh McDowell – Cello
Melvyn Gale – Cello
Mike Edwards – Cello

References

2007 greatest hits albums
Albums produced by Jeff Lynne
Electric Light Orchestra compilation albums
Epic Records compilation albums